Nithyasree Mahadevan (born 25 August 1973), also referred to as S. Nithyasree, is a Carnatic musician and playback singer for film songs in many Indian languages. Nithyashree has performed in all major sabhas in India. She has released more than 500 albums. She is best known for her rendition of the A. R. Rahman composition, "Kannodu Kaanbadhellam" - her playback debut song in the Tamil movie Jeans.

Family
Nithyasree was born to Lalitha Sivakumar and Iswaran Sivakumar. Her paternal grandmother, D. K. Pattammal, and her grand-uncle, D. K. Jayaraman, were prominent Carnatic vocalists who were established disciples of Ambi Dikshithar, Papanasam Sivan, Koteeswara Iyer, T.L.Venkataramayyar and others. Her maternal grandfather was the mridangam maestro, Palghat Mani Iyer.

Nithyasree first learnt music from her mother, Lalitha Sivakumar. Like her mother, Nithyasree was also the disciple of D. K. Pattammal, and would accompany her in concert. Her father, an accomplished mridangist and disciple of his father-in-law Palghat Mani Iyer, constantly shows his support and accompanies her when she performs. Nithyasree has also been vocally accompanied in some concerts by her niece and disciple, Lavanya Sundararaman.

Nithyasree was married to V. Mahadevan, until his suicide in 2012. Tanujashree and Tejashree, their two daughters, have also accompanied their mother on stage in concerts.

Musical career

First performance
Nithyasree's first public Carnatic performance was at the age of 14. The 1 hour concert, which was scheduled between 6:00 pm and 7:00 pm, was held for the Youth Association For Classical Music on 10 August 1987. Prominent Carnatic musicians that were present at the concert, included D. K. Pattammal, D. K. Jayaraman, as well as the chief guest at that concert, K. V. Narayanaswamy.

Thematic presentations

She has given numerous concerts consisting of only patriotic songs to commemorate the 50th year of Indian Independence, a few with D. K. Pattammal before her grandmother stopped performing in public.

D. K. Jayaraman and D. K. Pattammal were known for singing and popularising the compositions of Papanasam Sivan, having learnt them directly from the composer himself.  Nithyasree has continued this tradition. She has also given a lecture demonstration in Coimbatore for Manoranjitham on "Papanasam Sivan – A Legend", and made two special thematic albums that solely contained his compositions.

Like D. K. Pattammal, Nithyasree presented a concert consisting solely of compositions set to raga Bhairavi. Nithyasree's concert was presented in 1994 over a duration of 3 hours, and consisted of 17 compositions in total. Similarly, in 1999, her album "BHAIRAVI" was released by Charsur Digital Workstation which solely consisted of a Ragam Tanam Pallavi in ragas containing the name "Bhairavi".

Like D. K. Pattammal, Nithyasree has also popularised compositions of Gopalakrishna Bharathi. She presented a paper on the Life and Contribution of Gopalakrishna Bharathi for the Music Department of PSG College of Arts and Science, Coimbatore. Her three thematic albums that solely consisted of his compositions have been very popular, both online and offline.

Nithyasree Mahadevan has more than 750 albums to her credit on various themes and titles which are very popular among rasikas.

Touring
Nithyasree Mahadevan has performed in all major sabhas all over India and has presented her concerts in the United States of America, Canada, United Kingdom, Australia, United Arab Emirates, Germany, France, Singapore, Malaysia, Switzerland, Belgium, New Zealand, Tanzania, Sri Lanka, and various other destinations throughout the world.

Playback singing
List of songs recorded by Nithyasree Mahadevan
Nithyasree Mahadevan made her debut as a playback singer after being invited by prominent music producer, A. R. Rahman to record a song for the Tamil film, Jeans. Her playback debut song "Kannodu Kaanbadhellam" became an instant hit after the film's release, and won her the Tamil Nadu State Film Award for Best Female Playback Singer for 1998.

After her instant success in 1998, Nithyasree began recording more songs for A. R. Rahman in the same combination, like "Minsara Kanna" for the 1999 film  Padayappa, "Sowkiyama Kannae" for the 1999 film Sangamam, and "Manmatha Maasam" for the 2001 film Parthale Paravasam. These songs again were successfully received in digital stores following the release of the 2006 compilation Introducing A. R. Rahman.

Some of her other Tamil film songs include "Kumbakonam Sandhayile" from New released in 2004, "Oru Nadhi Oru Pournami" from Samurai released in 2002, "Kana Kaangiren" from Ananda Thandavam, "Ore Manam" from Villain and "Thaai Thindra Mannae" from the film Aayirathil Oruvan released in 2010.

Nithyasree also recorded songs for films which were in other South Indian languages, including "Raa Raa" for music director Gurukiran in the 2004 Kannada film Apthamitra, "Vaaraai" for music director Vidyasagar in the 2005 Telugu-dubbed film Chandramukhi, and "Varuvayi Thozhi" for composer Ouseppachan in the 2012 Malayalam film Arike.

Music Director and Composer
Nithyasree Mahadevan has composed music for songs, and has composed background scores for studio album recordings.

Semmozhi Anthem
Nithyasree Mahadevan was one among the singers who sang the "Semmozhiyaana Thamizh Mozhiyaam" song for the World Classical Tamil Conference 2010. She also appeared on the screen after Aruna Sayeeram and was followed by S. Sowmya.

Television works
Nithyasree has appeared as a guest judge in various reality TV music talent shows, often aired on Tamil language TV channels. She first appeared as a guest judge in Sun TV's Sapthaswarangal. She later appeared as a guest judge in several episodes and rounds of Zee Tamil's Sa Re Ga Ma Pa 2009 Challenge, before appearing as a judge for STAR Vijay in seasons 2, 3, and 4 of Airtel Super Singer Junior, seasons 3, 4, and 5 of Airtel Super Singer, the debut episode of Super Singer Celebrity Season, and Nippon Paint Super Singer Junior season 5. She also appeared as a guest judge on episodes 22 and 23 of Indian Voice which was aired in October 2012 on Mazhavil Manorama, a Malayalam language TV channel, and as a guest judge for the finals of season 6 of Raj TV's Raja Geetham, which was held on 6 August 2015 at Kamarajar Arangam, and subsequently aired on 15 August 2015. Nithyashree appeared as a special guest for the debut season of Zee Tamil's Sa Re Ga Ma Pa Lil Champs. In March 2018, she returned as a special guest in the classical round of Sa Re Ga Ma Pa Seniors, a week after the tribute round to music director M. S. Viswanathan featuring special guests Vani Jairam and P. Susheela was telecast. During March 2018, Nithyashree also made her first appearance as a special guest judge in Sun TV's Sun Singer.

Nithyasree was also a permanent judge in reality TV music talent shows. In 2014, Nithyasree was a permanent judge in season 3 of Raj TV's Carnatic music reality-talent show, Tanishq Swarna Sangeetham, having previously appeared as a guest judge at various levels in earlier seasons of the show. Nithyasree also appeared as a permanent judge in the debut season of Jaya Super Singer South India which was aired on Jaya TV between 2014 and 2015.

She sang several advertisement jingles for various companies, including more recently Sree Kumaran Thangamaligai which was recorded and aired on various Tamil language TV channels. Nithyasree has also sung title songs for various TV serials which were recorded and telecast in South India, including Chithi - a mega serial originally aired on Sun TV.

Titles, awards and other recognition
Nithyasree is a "Top Rank" graded artist of Akashvani, and All India Radio, Chennai. She received the "Best Concert Award" for 6 years from the Madras Music Academy, and won the Kalaimamani award from the Government of Tamil Nadu, who subsequently appointed her as a member in the Expert Committee panel in the "IYAL ISAI NATAKA MANDRAM". During her career, Nithyasree has been bestowed with numerous other titles, and won numerous other awards and prizes.

References

Women Carnatic singers
Carnatic singers
Musicians from Chennai
Living people
Performers of Hindu music
Indian women classical singers
Indian women playback singers
Tamil playback singers
Kannada playback singers
1973 births
Tamil Nadu State Film Awards winners
People from Thanjavur district
21st-century Indian singers
21st-century Indian women singers
Women musicians from Tamil Nadu
Singers from Tamil Nadu